The 2020 Tipperary Senior Hurling Championship was the 130th staging of the Tipperary Senior Hurling Championship since its establishment by the Tipperary County Board in 1887. The draw for the group stage placings took place on 27 January 2020. The championship was scheduled to begin in April 2020, however, it was postponed indefinitely due to the impact of the COVID-19 pandemic on Gaelic games. The championship eventually began on 25 July and ended on 20 September 2020.

Borris–Ileigh were the defending champions, however, they were beaten by Drom & Inch in a penalty shoot-out at the quarter-final stage. Burgess were relegated after a 1-17 to 0-16 defeat by Éire Óg Annacarty in a playoff.

On 20 September 2020, Kiladangan won the championship after a 1-28 to 3-20 extra-time defeat of Loughmore–Castleiney in the final at Semple Stadium. This was their first ever championship title.	
	
Loughmore–Castleiney's John McGrath was the championship's top scorer with 1-64.

Team Changes
The following teams have changed division since the 2019 Tipperary Senior Hurling Championship.

To Championship
Promoted from 2019 Tipperary Senior Roinn II (Séamus Ó Riain Cup)
 J.K. Bracken's -  (Séamus Ó Riain Cup Champions)

From Championship
Relegated to 2020 Tipperary Senior Roinn II (Séamus Ó Riain Cup)
 Portroe

Group stage

The championship format essentially remained the same with 16 teams being divided into four groups of four teams, however, on 25 June 2020 the management committee of the Tipperary County Board announced the removal of the preliminary quarter-finals and the abolition of a place for a divisional champion in the knock-out stage.

Table

Results

Group 2

Table

Results

Group 3

Table

Results

Group 4

Table

Results

Relegation play-off

Semi-finals

Final

Finals

Bracket

Quarter-finals

Semi-finals

Final

Championship statistics

Top scorers

Overall

In a single game

Miscellaneous

 Kiladangan won their first title, having previously lost three finals.

References

Tipperary Senior Hurling Championship
Tipperary
Tipperary Championship
Tipperary Senior Hurling Championship